Jan Cock Blomhoff (Amsterdam, 5 August 1779 – Amersfoort, 15 August 1853) was director ("opperhoofd") of Dejima, the Dutch trading colony in the harbour of Nagasaki, Japan, 1817–1824, succeeding Hendrik Doeff.

During his first stay on the island (1809–1813) he had an affair with a Japanese woman and the couple had a child, who died in 1813.
 
When he arrived in Dejima for the second time in August 1817 he was accompanied by his wife Titia Bergsma, whom he had married in 1815; his son Johannes; Petronella Muns, a Dutch wetnurse; and an Indonesian maid.  The ladies and the little boy were not allowed to stay. In the short time they stayed there, till December 1817, they were often drawn by artists, who had never seen other than Japanese women, and 500 different prints widely circulated throughout the country.

Blomhoff is commemorated in the specific name of an Asiatic pit viper, Gloydius blomhoffii.

In Japan he is well known for his support for making the first English dictionary for Japanese, which is Angeriagorintaisei.

See also
Dutch East India Company
VOC Opperhoofden in Japan

Notes

References
Effert, Rudy. (2008).  Royal Cabinets and Auxiliary Branches. Leiden: Research School CNWS. ;  OCLC 244247206
. (1963). Historical documents relating to Japan in foreign countries: an inventory of microfilm acquisitions in the library of the Historiographical Institute, the University of Tokyo. OCLC  450710
Jolien C. Hemmes en Ennius H. Bergsma, Brieven uit Deshima, met het complete, originele verslag over de reis naar Japan van Jan Cock Blomhoff en Titia Bergsma met hun zoontje, plus 100 oude afbeeldingen, eerste druk 2017, tweede druk 2021, © JCH, ISBNnr: 9789090349473, NUR: 691, www.brievenuitdeshima.nl (Publication with the original manuscript about the trip with his wife and son written by the father of Titia, using her letters to her parents.)

1779 births
1853 deaths
19th-century Dutch businesspeople
Businesspeople from Amsterdam
Dutch chiefs of factory in Japan